Kazimierz Zwierz (died 1682) was a Roman Catholic prelate who served as Auxiliary Bishop of Lutsk (1664–1682)

Biography
On 10 Nov 1664, Kazimierz Zwierz was appointed during the papacy of Pope Alexander VII as Auxiliary Bishop of Lutsk and Titular Bishop of Orthosias in Caria. He was consecrated bishop in 1665. He served as Auxiliary Bishop of Lutsk until his death in 1682.

See also 
Catholic Church in Ukraine

References

External links and additional sources
 (for Chronology of Bishops) 
 (for Chronology of Bishops)  

17th-century Roman Catholic bishops in the Polish–Lithuanian Commonwealth
Bishops appointed by Pope Alexander VII
1682 deaths